"High on Life" is a song by Dutch DJ Martin Garrix. A progressive house ballad featuring Swedish songwriter and vocalist Kristoffer "Bonn" Fogelmark, it was released via his Stmpd Rcrds label, which is exclusively-licensed to a Sony Music sublabel, Epic Amsterdam. The song's production credits consist of frequent Garrix collaborators Matisse & Sadko, Albin Nedler and established producer Giorgio Tuinfort, who has produced multiple songs with Garrix.

The American radio station WXHT samples and interpolates the song in their hourly station IDs

Background
Garrix's label had announced via Twitter the song would be immediately available for release "the moment (Garrix) plays it at #Tomorrowland" during his headlining closing performance. It was premiered at the Tomorrowland 2018 music festival in Belgium as the closing song on 29 July 2018. It was also released at midnight on the same day.

"High on Life" is one of the two songs announced by Garrix for release since his last single "Ocean" with Khalid, the other being a collaboration with Justin Mylo that would be released in September.

Production 
The song has been musically compared to Garrix's previous singles such as "Dragon", "Lions in the Wild" and "Forever", as an "energetic and emotion-filled progressive house track". The song is noted as a "return to his roots" in reference to Garrix's regular crossover musical style of pop music to his typical big room house and progressive house.

Described as an uplifting summer song that is a "synth-heavy festival house tune", the song's production has been compared to the style of late Swedish DJ Avicii, who had worked with Garrix for the song "Waiting for Love".

Music video 
The music video for the song has also been released, featuring clips from Garrix's Tomorrowland performance which shows "the most standard and spectacular face of Tomorrowland". It was released to YouTube and streaming platforms five minutes after the performance at Tomorrowland ended.

Personnel 
Credits adapted from Tidal.

 Martijn Garritsen – production, composing, songwriting, performer
 Matisse & Sadko – production
 Kristoffer Fogelmark – composing, songwriting, vocals
 Albin Nedler – composing, songwriting, backing vocals
 Giorgio Tuinfort – composing, songwriting

Charts

Weekly charts

Year-end charts

Certifications

References

2018 songs
Martin Garrix songs
Progressive house songs
Stmpd Rcrds singles
2018 singles
Songs written by Martin Garrix
Songs written by Giorgio Tuinfort
Songs written by Kristoffer Fogelmark
Songs written by Albin Nedler